Fifteen years ago, the old bus station of Vitoria-Gasteiz, Spain was demolished. Then some years later, Artium Museum was built in the place where the old bus station had been built. After demolishing the old bus station, a new one was built in Los Herran street. However, the current bus station in Vitoria, the one in Los Herran street, is just working temporarily, because in May 2011 the construction of the new bus station was going to begin. Some months prior, the town hall organized a competition in which the participants, taking in account some requirements, were asked to design an intermodal bus station in Vitoria. Eight companies presented their jobs, and the town hall decided that the project designed by Fernando Ruiz de Ocenda, Iñaki Usandizaga and Francisco Javier Garcia de Acilu (in contribution with trakteplan engineries) was the most appropriate.

Purpose
The new bus station, which later will be part of an intermodal station, is going to be constructed in Arriaga park. This construction, is going to occupy 30% of the whole park, 13,639 meters of its totality of extension. It is going to be located on the corner of the southwest part of the park, next to America Latina roundabout, and giving its face to Honduras Street.

It is said that this new building is going to create more than a hundred jobs during its construction, and 3500 more after being constructed, so as to make it work properly. Due to this fact, it is expected that the unemployment in Vitoria will go down noticeably. When the project was designed, the whole construction and the ramp-up to operation was expected to cost 15 million euros. However, lately the budget has increased to 18.5 million euros due to the improvement of the project.

In addition, a new underground car park is going to be built which will benefit the people who live in that neighbourhood and also the travellers. This bus station, will also have some elements which will absorb energy from the sun. These elements will create the 50% of the energy which the station will need to work. The designers of the project, have also decided to put a monolith made of copper which will be a symbol of the intermodal station and which will also function as the support of a screen which will show the timetable of the buses and trains. This monolith, will be located on the intersection between Portal de Foronda and Juan de Garay.

Distribution
The new bus station, will be a two-storey building which will have a basement too:

Ground floor
Service buildings (2,042 m2)
 - Hall
 - Shop
 - Left-luggage room
 - Toilets
 - Access to: installations, emergency exit, control room, equipment space, Lakua neighbourhood, basement and first floor

Docks (9,222 m2)
 - 21 covered docks and another 4 spare glazed docks
 - Outdoor gardens

First floor
Service buildings(1,454 m2)
 - Technical offices
 - Restaurant
 - Toilets
 - Control room
 - Access to: Ground floor and second floor.

Second floor
Local services and equipment(495.20 m2)

Basement
Service buildings
 - Access to the future railway station
 - Installation rooms

2 other projects
Some years ago, everybody knew that Vitoria needed a new bus station, since the current one was not at all comfortable and had very few docks. That is why, the town hall decided some months ago to organize a competition in which the participants would be asked to design the new bus station from Vitoria. The town hall chose the three best projects and decided which one was the most appropriate and which fitted more with the city. These chosen projects had been designed by Trakteplan, GLM Unigest and Mozas&Aguirre architect companies. The chosen project, was the one designed by Trakteplan firm and it has been described in the introduction. However, the other two projects were quite interesting too.

GLM Unigest's project
This project, is based on a semi-underground structure. Thanks to this semi-underground structure, the bus station would not have so much impact on Arriaga park. The project also consists on a semi-underground terminal with an organic design of the facade which tries to be integrated on the park. Due to the semi-underground structure, the docks would have natural light and would be properly ventilated. Furthermore, the station would have three travelators (mechanic stairs) and two lifts. This project consists on 21 docks and thanks to its easy access, 3400 passengers would arrive and leave per hour.

GLM Unigest, proposed two different options for the cover of the docks. One of the proposals was to build a small car park with 73 parking spaces. This car park could just be used 15 minutes and just by the people which were using the bus station or going to pick someone up from the station. The other option, was to put a garden on the cover so that the station would not have such a big impact on the park and people would have the option of wandering around there.

This project totally fits with the budget of 18.5 million Euro that the town hall proposed. Besides, due to its small impact on the park, it has been one of the projects that most of the residents of Lakua have defended.

Mozas-Aguirre's project
This project also has a semi-underground structure. However, in case of being located on Arriaga park, it is located beside it, on the median strip of Portal de Foronda street. Although it does not affect the park, it has many drawbacks that complicate the traffic on that area. Because this project locates the station where a tramline is located, the tramline would have to be moved and the budget would increase. Moreover, the traffic of the buses would be more difficult. Besides, the connection with the railway station would be longer and would be more difficult. Nevertheless, this project has totally been defended by the residents of Lakua since it has no effects on the park.
To sum up, this project would be a very good option, if the problem of traffic could be resolved.

Critics against the chosen project
The construction of this new station, has created lots of arguments and problems. Because the station is going to be built in the southwest corner of the park, a lot of residents of the neighbourhood have complained about it. The main point of the argument, was that the %30 of the park was going to disappear because of this construction. It is true that the town hall said that some of the trees which were affected by the construction (104 from 348 which are going to be cut) would be planted during and after the construction. However, as most of the residents of the neighbourhood have seen, three of the trees planted, have died and the other 10 are in a very bad quality.

It has also been said, that the chosen project, is the project that affects more to the park. Mozas&Aguirre company, though, designed a project which did not affect the park at all. Nevertheless, this project has not been chosen because it does not respect the requirements imposed for designing the station. This project, does not locate the station on the park, so it has no effects on the park and neither on the environment. Although most of the residents from the neighbourhood defended this project, the construction would create a very big problem with traffic which would have to be sorted out.

As the well-informed people say, with the construction of the bus station, 16.000 m2 (taking in account the caravan park located on Arriaga park too) of the whole park would be occupied. Afterwards, with the construction of the railway station, another 14.000 m2 would be occupied. Taking in account this piece of information, more than the 97% of the residents from that area are totally against this construction. Furthermore, the residents of the area are against the chosen project, because the town hall has not even studied other alternatives and has decided to build the bus station there, without taking anybody's opinion in account.

The park, was created in 1979 and it is the biggest park in Vitoria because it occupies 176,400 m2. That is why it is considered one of the lunges of Vitoria. Furthermore, it contains more than 150 botanical species. This park is used every day for jogging, doing sport or just wandering around it. Because of all these pieces of information, most of the people who live on that area, are against the chosen project, because this great urban lung is part of Vitoria, and even more important, it is part of ourselves.

Sustainability
The town hall has stated that the main disadvantage of the station, is the effect it has on the environment and specially on the park. Due to this fact, the town hall has tried to deter the park as less practical. That is why the town hall has located the station on a place where its drawbacks are less than in other part of the park. The station will be located on the current caravan park in Arriaga park and thanks to this, fewer trees will be affected and cut down. Furthermore, the designers of the project have put some solar cells and geothermal cells to get renewable energy in order not to affect so much the environment. These cells will create 50% of all the energy needed for making everything work.

Reasons for the station not to be built
Most of the residents of Lakuarriaga are against this project because it has many drawbacks, and there are many reasons why it would not have to be built:

 As the station in Los Herran, the station that is about to be built could also be provisional and it would have cost 18.5 million.
 It would occupy 16,000 m2 from the whole park while some other alternatives, which do not affect the park, have not been studied.
 The future train station would occupy another 14,000 m2 and the whole intermodal station would occupy 30,000 m2.
 After having said that the station would be built underground, building a semi-underground one is a step back.
 It does not guarantee that in the future, the ampliations of the intermodal station will not affect even more Arriaga park.
 It does not guarantee the hygiene and security of the park, because building the station in the park will pollute the park.
 The opinion of the whole neighbourhood has not been taken in account.

References

http://www.mozasaguirre.com

http://www.glmproyectos.com

https://web.archive.org/web/20110702143705/http://sosparquearriaga.es/

http://www.trakteplan.com

Vitoria-Gasteiz